Ye Zhao was a KMT general from Guangdong. He graduated from the Baoding Military Academy in 1919. In 1937, he fought at the Battle of Shanghai. During the Nationalist withdrawal from Shanghai, Ye obtained a set of used peasant clothes from a deserted farm building west of the building, and was conscripted as a porter by the advancing Japanese, who had no idea of his real identity. He survived and eventually made his way back to Shanghai. Ye commanded the 21st group in November 1939 and was detained in April 1940 following the army's loss at Kunlun Pass. In 1949, he went to Hong Kong and later settled in Taiwan.

References

National Revolutionary Army generals from Guangdong
1892 births
Year of death missing